Abbot's Kitchen may refer to:

 Abbot's Kitchen, Glastonbury, Somerset, England
 Abbot's Kitchen, Oxford, Oxfordshire, England